Enciso is a town and municipality in the García Rovira Province, part of Santander Department in northeastern Colombia. Founded on September 9, 1773, by Juan de Enciso, the liberating campaign of Simon Bolivar passed by this municipality on 7 occasions between the years 1814 and 1821.

Municipalities of Santander Department